John H. Sinfelt (February 18, 1931 in Munson, Clearfield County, Pennsylvania – May 28, 2011 in Morristown, New Jersey) was an American chemical engineer whose research on catalytic reforming was responsible for the introduction of unleaded gasoline.

Sinfelt worked for the Standard Oil Development Company (now Exxon Mobil Research and Engineering), where he specialized in developing techniques to speed up chemical reactions. He later patented that method.

Honors and awards
1975 National Academy of Engineering
1977 Dickson Prize in Science
1978 James C. McGroddy Prize for New Materials
1979 National Medal of Science
1979 elected to the U.S. National Academy of Sciences
1989 elected to the American Academy of Arts and Sciences
1984 Perkin Medal
1984 American Institute of Chemists Gold Medal
1986 E. V. Murphree Award in Industrial and Engineering Chemistry
1988 Chemical Pioneer Award
1994 elected to the American Philosophical Society

References

1931 births
2011 deaths
American chemical engineers
National Medal of Science laureates
Businesspeople from Pennsylvania
Penn State College of Engineering alumni
University of Illinois alumni
Members of the United States National Academy of Sciences
20th-century American businesspeople

Members of the American Philosophical Society